was a Japanese professional motorcycle road racer, racing driver, and team manager. Nicknamed "Kuni-san", he is known as the "father of drifting".

His racing career lasted from 1958 to 1999. He competed on motorcycles between 1958 and 1963, during which he became the first Japanese rider to win a World Grand Prix, taking four world-level wins in total. Injuries sustained in a crash in 1962 led to him switching to four-wheels in 1965, after which he won the 24 Hours of Le Mans in class, become a four-time All-Japan Sports Prototype Champion, and won in Japanese Top Formula, JTC, and JGTC. His final victory as a driver in 1999 came at the age of 59.

His racing team, Team Kunimitsu, has won multiple championships in Super GT. He was the chairman of the GT Association, the organizers of the Super GT series, from 1993 to 2007.

Motorcycle racing
In 1961, Takahashi became the first Japanese rider to win a motorcycle Grand Prix riding a 250cc Honda to victory at Hockenheim. His best World Championship finishes were a fourth place in the 1961 250 world championship and a fourth place in the 1962 125 world championship, both times on a Honda. He was seriously injured in the 1962 Isle of Man TT and switched to car racing in 1965. He won four Grand Prix races during his motorcycle racing career.

Car racing
Takahashi participated in one Formula One race, the 1977 Japanese Grand Prix on 23 October 1977, driving the non-works Tyrrell that Kazuyoshi Hoshino had used in the 1976 Japanese Grand Prix. Takahashi finished 9th in his single Grand Prix outing, thus he scored no championship points. From 1987 to 1992, he competed in the Japanese Formula 3000 championship. He also competed in eight 24 Hours of Le Mans races between 1986 and 1996. In the 1995 24 Hours of Le Mans, his team competed with a Honda NSX, winning the GT2 Class and finishing eighth overall.

In 1994, he formed Team Kunimitsu to compete in the inaugural JGTC season, running a Porsche 911 RSR Turbo in the GT1 class alongside Keiichi Tsuchiya. In 1996, with the advent of the GT500 class, Team Kunimitsu switched manufacturers from Porsche to Honda. The next year, Team Kunimitsu cars wore the Raybrig colors for the first time. Takahashi drove for his own team until 1999. He retired at the end of the season to focus on team management. Team Kunimitsu won their first Drivers Championship in 2018 with Naoki Yamamoto and 2009 Formula One champion Jenson Button behind the wheel of the #100 Raybrig Honda.

Death
Takahashi died from lymphoma on 16 March 2022, at the age of 82.

Career motorsports results

Motorcycle Grand Prix results
(key) (Races in italics indicate fastest lap)

Complete Formula One results
(key)

Super Formula Championship results 

(key) (Races in bold indicate pole position) (Races in italics indicate fastest lap)

All-Japan Sports Prototype Championship results

24 Hours of Le Mans results

All-Japan GT Championship results

Complete British Saloon Car Championship results
(key) (Races in bold indicate pole position; races in italics indicate fastest lap.)

Complete Japanese Touring Car Championship results

References

External links

Kunimitsu Takahashi career statistics at MotoGP.com
Official Team Site

1940 births
2022 deaths 
Deaths from lymphoma 
Deaths from cancer in Japan
Sportspeople from Tokyo
Japanese motorcycle racers
Japanese racing drivers
Japanese Formula One drivers
Japanese Formula Two Championship drivers
Japanese Formula 3000 Championship drivers
Japanese Touring Car Championship drivers
British Touring Car Championship drivers
24 Hours of Le Mans drivers
50cc World Championship riders
125cc World Championship riders
250cc World Championship riders
Isle of Man TT riders
World Sportscar Championship drivers
Sports car racing team owners
Japanese Sportscar Championship drivers
Team Kunimitsu drivers